Turn It On is the second EP from American country music band Eli Young Band. It was released on March 10, 2015, and its title track was released as a single to country radio, with a music video debuted during the previous week.

Track listing

Charts

Album

Singles

References

External links

2015 EPs
Eli Young Band EPs
Republic Records EPs